Charles de Bouvens  was a French pulpit orator who had to flee the French Revolution due to his conservative views.

References

18th-century French Roman Catholic priests
French counter-revolutionaries
Year of birth missing
Year of death missing